Ilse Koch (22 September 1906 – 1 September 1967) was a German war criminal who committed atrocities while her husband Karl-Otto Koch was commandant at Buchenwald. Though Ilse Koch had no official position in the Nazi state, she became one of the most infamous Nazi figures at war's end for allegations that she had selected tattooed prisoners for death in order to fashion lampshades and other items from their skins.

Her 1947 U.S. military trial at Dachau received worldwide media attention, as did the testimony of survivors who described sadistic and perverse behaviors - giving rise to the image of her as "the concentration camp murderess."

She was known as "The Witch of Buchenwald" by the inmates because of her cruelty and lasciviousness toward prisoners. She has been nicknamed "The Beast of Buchenwald", the "Queen of Buchenwald", the "Red Witch of Buchenwald", "Butcher Widow", and "The Bitch of Buchenwald".

Early life
Koch was born Margarete Ilse Köhler in Dresden, Germany, the daughter of a former military commander. She was known as a polite and happy child in her elementary school. At the age of 15, she entered an accountancy school. Later, she entered employment as a bookkeeping clerk. At the time the economy of Germany had not yet recovered from defeat in World War I. In 1932, she became a member of the Nazi Party. Through some friends in the SA and SS, she met her future husband, Karl-Otto Koch, in 1934.

In 1936, she followed her fiancé Karl-Otto Koch to Sachsenhausen concentration camp near Berlin, where he had been posted as Commandant. The couple married the same year. In 1937, Karl was then posted to Buchenwald.

War crimes
While at Buchenwald, Koch engaged in gruesome experiments; selected tattooed prisoners were murdered and skinned to retrieve the tattooed parts of their bodies. This was allegedly done to help a prison doctor, in his dissertation on tattooing and criminality.

In 1940, she built an indoor riding arena, which cost over 250,000 reichsmarks (approximately $62,500), most of which had been seized from the inmates. In 1941, Karl-Otto Koch was transferred to Lublin, where he helped establish the Majdanek concentration and extermination camp. Ilse Koch remained at Buchenwald until 24 August 1943, when she and her husband were arrested on the orders of Josias von Waldeck-Pyrmont, SS and Police Leader for Weimar, who had supervisory authority over Buchenwald. The charges against the Kochs comprised private enrichment, embezzlement, and the murder of prisoners to prevent them from giving testimony.

Ilse Koch was imprisoned until 1944 when she was acquitted for lack of evidence. Her husband was found guilty and sentenced to death by an SS court in Munich, and was executed by firing squad on 5 April 1945 in the court of the camp he once commanded. She then lived with her surviving family in the town of Ludwigsburg, where she was arrested by U.S. authorities on 30 June 1945.

First postwar trial

Koch and 30 other accused were arraigned before the American military court at Dachau (General Military Government Court for the Trial of War Criminals) in 1947. Prosecuting her was future United States Court of Claims Judge Robert L. Kunzig. She was charged with "participating in a criminal plan for aiding, abetting and participating in the murders at Buchenwald".

Koch stated in the courtroom that she was eight months pregnant but on 19 August 1947, she was sentenced to life imprisonment for "violation of the laws and customs of war".

Reduction of sentence
Gen. Lucius D. Clay, then interim military governor of the American Zone in Germany, reduced the judgment to four years' imprisonment on 8 June 1948, after she had served two years of her sentence, on the grounds that "there was no convincing evidence that she had selected inmates for extermination in order to secure tattooed skins, or that she possessed any articles made of human skin". 

However, Clay also suggested that Koch be tried under West German law, "I hold no sympathy for Ilse Koch. She was a woman of depraved character and ill repute. She had done many things reprehensible and punishable, undoubtedly, under German law. We were not trying her for those things. We were trying her as a war criminal on specific charges."

The reduction of the sentence resulted in an uproar, when it was made public on 16 September 1948, but Clay stood firm by his decision. Years later Clay stated:

 The Buchenwald Memorial Foundation states that:

Second trial
A Senate committee immediately held a hearing over the reduction. Following an investigation, they said reducing Koch's sentence was a mistake, but was also irreversible. However, the committee urged the West German government to put Koch on trial for crimes against German nationals, something over which the Dachau commission did not have jurisdiction, and instructed the military give full assistance to West German investigators.

Koch was immediately re-arrested following her release in 1949, and tried before a West German court. The hearing opened on 27 November 1950 before the District Court at Augsburg and lasted seven weeks, during which 250 witnesses were heard, including 50 for the defense. Koch collapsed and had to be carried from the court in late December 1950, and again on 11 January 1951. At least four witnesses for the prosecution testified that they had seen Koch choose tattooed prisoners, who were then killed, or had seen or been involved in the process of making human-skin lampshades from tattooed skin. However, this charge was dropped by the prosecution when they could not prove lampshades or any other items were actually made from human skin.

On 15 January 1951, the Court pronounced its verdict, in a 111-page-long decision, for which Koch was not present in court. It was concluded that the previous trials in 1944 and 1947 were not a bar to proceedings under the principle of ne bis in idem, as at the 1944 trial Koch had only been charged with receiving, while in 1947 she had been accused of crimes against foreigners after 1 September 1939, and not with crimes against humanity of which Germans and Austrians had been defendants both before and after that date. She was convicted of charges of incitement to murder, incitement to attempted murder and incitement to the crime of committing grievous bodily harm, and on 15 January 1951 was sentenced to life imprisonment at hard labor and permanent forfeiture of her civil rights.

On 10 May 1951 Koch was indicted by Dr. Hans Ilkow, chief prosecutor at the superior court in Augsburg. On 15 June 1951, Koch officially started her life imprisonment sentence. Koch appealed to have the judgment quashed, but the appeal was dismissed on 22 April 1952 by the Federal Court of Justice. She later made several petitions for a pardon, all of which were rejected by the Bavarian Ministry of Justice. Koch protested her life sentence, to no avail, to the International Human Rights Commission.

Family
Ilse and Karl Koch had one son and two daughters. Their son committed suicide after the war "because he couldn't live with the shame of the crimes of his parents." Another son, Uwe, conceived in her prison cell at Dachau with a fellow German prisoner, was born in the Aichach prison near Dachau where Koch was sent to serve her life sentence and was immediately taken from her. At the age of 19, Uwe Köhler learned that Koch was his mother and began visiting her regularly at Aichach.

Suicide
Koch hanged herself at Aichach women's prison on 1 September 1967 at age 60. She experienced delusions and had become convinced that concentration camp survivors would abuse her in her cell.

In 1971, her son Uwe sought posthumous rehabilitation for his mother. Via the press, he used clemency documents from her former lawyer in 1957 and his impression of her based on their relationship in an attempt to change people's attitude towards Koch.

In popular culture
 Woody Guthrie wrote "Ilsa Koch", a song about her abuses in Buchenwald, her imprisonment and release; it was recorded by The Klezmatics.
 Koch was the inspiration for a series of Nazi exploitation films, such as Ilsa, She Wolf of the SS (1975). 
 The British label Come Organisation released a noise music compilation Für Ilse Koch (wdc881021) in 1982 featuring bands Nurse with Wound, Consumer Electronics, Etat Brut, Club Moral (wrongly listed as "Wiking DDV"), Whitehouse and others.
 Some scholars have contended that Koch was the inspiration for the character portrayed by Kate Winslet in the 2008 feature film The Reader, although Bernhard Schlink, the author of the novel from which the film was adapted, declined to confirm this suggestion.
 Koch's life inspired the documentary The Bitch of Buchenwald directed by Gerry Malir and narrated by Peter Morgan Jones. The movie was released in 2009 to detail the life and crimes of Ilse Koch.
 There were numerous books written, including the limited series The Buchenwald trilogy. The very first of the series, titled The Beasts of Buchenwald: Karl & Ilse Koch, Human-skin Lampshades, and the War-crimes Trial of the Century, explored official crimes, accusations, as well as life outside of the concentration camps for Ilse and Karl Koch.

See also
 Female guards in Nazi concentration camps
 Irma Grese
 Phil Lamason, the senior officer in charge of 168 allied airmen taken to Buchenwald
 Maria Mandl
 Aribert Heim
 List of people who died by suicide by hanging

References

Sources

External links
 
 
 
 

1906 births
1967 suicides
Human trophy collecting
People from Dresden
People from the Kingdom of Saxony
Buchenwald concentration camp personnel
German people convicted of murder
Nazis who committed suicide in prison custody
German prisoners sentenced to life imprisonment
People convicted of murder by Germany
Prisoners sentenced to life imprisonment by Germany
Prisoners who died in German detention
Nazis who committed suicide in Germany
Female guards in Nazi concentration camps
Suicides by hanging in Germany
Sachsenhausen concentration camp personnel
People convicted in the Dachau trials